River Battle was a Splash Battle, an interactive water raft ride at Dollywood in Pigeon Forge, Tennessee. It was located behind the Mystery Mine roller coaster in the Wilderness Pass section. It opened on March 21, 2008. In 2017, it was announced that it would be removed. Its last day of operation was September 4, 2017.

History
In July 2007, Dollywood announced the addition of River Battle for the following year. The project also included a  walkway called Wilderness Pass to provide a direct route between Craftsman's Valley and Timber Canyon. The ride officially opened on March 21, 2008.

Ride
River Battle was the fourth Interactive Boat Rides developed by German firm, Mack Rides. Similar rides, known as Splash Battles, were previously built by 3DBA. Riders boarded one of eight boats which each seated 8 passengers and slowly floated around a  course. They had to shoot at the other boats and more than 100 targets along their way. The ride boasted an hourly capacity of 800 passengers.

See also
 Battle Boats, a similar ride at Sea World on the Gold Coast, Australia

References

Dollywood
Water rides
Amusement rides introduced in 2008
Splash Battle rides